DWKT (90.3 FM), broadcasting as 90.3 Energy FM, is a radio station owned and operated by Ultrasonic Broadcasting System. Its offices, studios and transmitter are located at the 4th floor, Duque Tiongson Bldg., A.B. Fernandez Ave., Dagupan, in the Philippines.

Throughout the 80s, it was known as KT 90.3, carrying a Top 40 format with the tagline Rhythm of Dagupan. In 1992, it rebranded as Mellow Touch 90.3 and carried a Soft AC format. In 2004, UBSI acquired the station from FBS Radio Network & rebranded it as 90.3 Energy FM due to the ownership swapping (along with cebu station in return for the latter's owned AM station in Mega Manila).

References

Radio stations in Dagupan
Radio stations established in 1980